Something of Value is a 1957 American drama film directed by Richard Brooks and starring Rock Hudson, Dana Wynter, and Sidney Poitier. The film was reissued under the title Africa Ablaze.

The film, based on the book of the same name by Robert Ruark, portrays the Mau Mau uprising in Kenya. It shows the colonial and native African conflict caused by colonialism and differing views on how life should be lived.  It stars Rock Hudson as the colonial and Sidney Poitier as the native Kenyan.  The two men grew up together but have drifted apart at maturity.

Plot
In British-ruled Kenya in 1945, members of the Kikuyu tribe work peacefully for considerate white settler Henry McKenzie, abiding by colonial laws, as well as their own religious beliefs, which forbid any violence against the settlers. Both in their early twenties, Henry's son Peter and black worker Kimani are close friends, having been raised together as brothers since the death of Henry's wife. One day, when Kimani asks to use a rifle during a lion hunt, Peter's brother-in-law, Jeff Newton, slaps the black man and reminds him that he cannot have the gun nor can he continue his friendship with Peter. A humiliated Kimani disappears from the camp, but, after being injured when his foot is caught in a trap, is rescued by Peter, who carries him home on his back. Kimani suggests that they must assume the roles of master and serf, but Peter refuses to change their relationship. Back at the black settlement, Kimani's father Karanja orders the murder of one of the tribe's newborns, which was born feet first, a condition the tribe believes to be a curse. After Karanja is arrested and sentenced to jail, Henry argues with the Crown consul that if the whites continue to take away the tribal elders' authority, the tribe children will begin to disrespect their own way of life and, he warns, disrespect the colonial Christian God. When Henry, Peter and Kimani visit the elderly man in jail, Karanja gives Henry his sacred stone. Karanja then encourages Kimani to assume his position as headman at the farm, but Kimani refuses to spend his life working as a white man's slave. One night, moved by moral outrage at the injustices against his father, Kimani attends a secret meeting of the Mau Mau, a group of black men planning an insurrection. He is asked by leader Njogu to prove his fidelity by stealing rifles. After one of the Mau Mau kills a black houseboy during the robbery, Kimani, troubled by their methods of achieving freedom, threatens to leave. Njogu tells Kimani he must remain with them because the police will now connect him to the crime.

Years later, in 1952, Peter, who now leads safaris to supplement the farm's dwindling income, welcomes Holly Keith, his betrothed, home after her years of studying abroad. As Kenya becomes increasingly tension-filled, Henry and other white settlers question the workers' wives about the sudden disappearance of many of their mates, but the frightened women do not respond. Meanwhile, Kimani submits to a Mau Mau oath in which he receives seven gashes to the arm, drinks sheep's blood and swears to drive the Europeans from Kenya no matter what the cost. When Kimani comments that Njogu has not taken the oath himself, the leader claims he is too old to change his faith in his gods who forbid him to perform many of the oath's tenets. Kimani then asks permission from Njogu to marry his daughter Wanjiru, who is carrying Kimani's child. The leader refuses to perform the Christian ceremony. Later, while Peter and Holly are celebrating their wedding night camping on the safari, the Mau Mau pillage the McKenzie farmhouse and murder Jeff and his two children. Kimani, torn between respect for the McKenzies and allegiance to Mau Mau, cannot follow through with killing Jeff's wife Elizabeth, and leaves her wounded. After a state of emergency is declared by the ruling British, Peter and neighbor Joe Matson track down a Mau Mau camp and bomb it with a grenade. The Mau Mau surrender and are forced into an internment camp where they are tortured for information. Peter subsequently returns home exhausted and unable to express his feelings to Holly because of moral torment he suffers from the events. Holly begs him to leave the country, but Peter will not leave his land. When Henry and Peter return to the camp, they find Joe cruelly torturing Njogu for information. Henry, knowing that killing Njogu will only make him a martyr, produces Naranja's sacred stone and asks Njogu if his gods would ask him to make the Mau Mau kill innocent children. Njogu, fearing that the wrath of his god symbolized in a violent thunderstorm passing above, admits that if his gods cannot accept Mau Mau, then the Mau Mau cannot lead his people. He then names Kimani, now a Mau Mau general, as the leader of the attack on the McKenzie home. As ruling British capture many Mau Mau followers, Peter and black worker Lathela search for Kimani. One night at the McKenzie home, Holly is forced to bravely fight when the Mau Mau attack again. Henry then sends Holly and Elizabeth, who is pregnant with Jeff's child, to Nairobi for protection.

Meanwhile, Peter and Lathela find Kimani and his followers in the jungle. Speaking to Kimani alone, Peter asks him to surrender. Kimani, who has never abandoned his doubts about the Mau Mau methods, agrees to meet at a hidden spring to discuss the terms of an agreement. Kimani then explains to his followers that they must negotiate with the whites, telling them "it is your own hatred that you see in others." In Nairobi, Peter joins Holly at the hospital where Elizabeth's child is born. When he suggests to Holly that they leave the country for a while, she tells him she loves Africa and wants to return home. Later, Peter discovers that Joe has already left for the spring with many armed men. He races to the spring to prevent any conflict, but when Kimani and the remaining Mau Mau arrive, Joe and his men shoot at the men, women and children. Kimani escapes with his infant son into the jungle, where Peter finds him in a cave and explains that they were both betrayed. When his old friend flees with a rifle, Peter pushes Kimani, causing the gun to slip from his hand. Setting the child down, Kimani threatens Peter with a large knife, but Peter grabs it and, holding to Kimani's throat, begs him to surrender to enable them both to start over again. Kimani insists he must kill Peter and, while grabbing for a gun, slides into a Mau Mau pit trap, where bamboo spikes pierce him. Kimani begs Peter to throw the child to him to die in the pit as well, but Peter keeps the child, carrying it home to be raised together with Elizabeth's newborn, in hopes that a new generation might resolve the inequities of East Africa.

Cast

Production
In January 1955, MGM announced they had bought the film rights to the novel for $300,000. The novel was published in April. The New York Times wrote of the book that "the explosive impact of Robert Ruark's 'Something of Value' will reverberate for a long time to come on both sides of the Atlantic."

The film was originally announced for Grace Kelly. It was to follow a proposed remake of The Barretts of Wimpole Street.

Producer Pandro S. Berman assigned the script to Richard Brooks, who undertook a research trip to Kenya.

At one stage British actor Bill Travers, then under contract to MGM, was discussed as a possible lead. Elizabeth Taylor was mentioned as a possible female lead.

In May 1956 it was announced Sidney Poitier would play the role of Kimani and Rock Hudson would be borrowed from Universal to play the lead. Filming began in July.

Reception
According to MGM records, the movie earned $2.1 million in the US and $1.5 million overseas, for a net loss of $410,000.

The movie was the sole American entry at the Venice Film Festival.

It was re-released in 1962 with the title Africa Ablaze.

Sequel
Ruark published a sequel to his original novel in 1962 called Uhuru. No film resulted.

See also
 List of American films of 1957

References

External links
 
 
 
 
 Review of film at The New York Times

1957 films
American black-and-white films
1950s English-language films
Films set in 1945
Films set in 1952
Films set in Kenya
Metro-Goldwyn-Mayer films
Films directed by Richard Brooks
Films shot in Kenya
Films set in the British Empire
Films scored by Miklós Rózsa
Films based on American novels